The Caudron C.600 Aiglon is a 1930s French two-seat monoplane sport/touring aircraft built by Caudron–Renault.

Development
The Aiglon (en: Eaglet) was designed by Marcel Riffard after he took over the design department when Caudron merged with Renault.  The Aiglon was a two-seat low-wing cantilever monoplane with tandem open cockpits.  The first of two prototypes first flew in March 1935 from Issy-les-Moulineaux, France.  Two special long-distance versions (C.610 Aiglons) were built with increased fuel capacity.  In December 1935 a C.610 was flown from Paris to Saigon at an average speed of 80 mph (129 km/h).

The type was popular with French private owners and flying clubs, and a number were sold abroad.  With the outbreak of the Second World War many of the aircraft were requisitioned by the French Government for use as liaison aircraft by the Armée de l'Air.  Total production of the Aiglon was 203 aircraft, including 178 of the basic Renault 4Pgi Bengali Junior powered model.

Variants
C.600 Aiglonproduction model with a Renault 4Pgi Bengali Junior engine, 178 built.
C.600G Aiglonmodified version with a de Havilland Gipsy Major engine, five built.
C.601 Aiglon Seniormodified version with a Renault 4Pei engine, 18 built.
C.610 Aiglonspecial long-distance single-seat version with increased fuel, two built.
Caudron KXC1A C.601 exported to Japan for evaluation by the Imperial Japanese Navy Air Service.

Operators
The aircraft was operated by flying clubs, private individuals and a few air forces:

Argentine Air Force

French Air Force

Guatemalan Air Force

Royal Hungarian Air Force operated 6 aircraft between 1943 and 1945

Imperial Japanese Navy Air Service, one example evaluated under designation KXC

Royal Romanian Air Force

Spanish Republican Air Force, used at El Carmolí fighter pilot training facility.

Specifications (C.600)

See also

References

Bibliography
 
 
 

Aircraft first flown in 1935
1930s French civil utility aircraft
C.600 Aiglon
Low-wing aircraft
Single-engined tractor aircraft